Naogaon K.D. Government High School is a public secondary school in Naogaon, Bangladesh. It was established in 1884, making it one of the oldest schools in Rajshahi division. According to the results of some past years, it is the best school in Naogaon district and one of the best in Rajshahi division. It runs from third grade to the tenth grade. The exertion of establishing a secondary school in Naogaon was taken by Babu Krishnadhan Bagchi, who was the deputy collector of Naogaon and supervisor of Gaza society of that time. By his efforts some landowners, rich people and farmers gave financial assistance. It was the first high school established in Naogaon (Though Raja Haranath High School was established in 1864, it was then a primary school and later in 1900 it was upgraded to a high school).

 Swopner Mofoswol 
 Naogaon k.d debate club
 i love my school.

 Debate Club

Gallery

References 

Schools in Naogaon District
High schools in Bangladesh
Educational institutions established in 1884
1884 establishments in India